Fountain Creek is a creek in Maury County, Tennessee. It is a tributary of the Duck River.

See also
List of rivers of Tennessee

Further reading

References

External links
USGS 03599450 FOUNTAIN CREEK NEAR FOUNTAIN HEIGHTS, TN on the website of the United States Geological Survey

Rivers of Maury County, Tennessee
Rivers of Tennessee